The Defence Select Committee is one of the Select Committees of the House of Commons of the United Kingdom, having been established in 1979. It examines the expenditure, administration, and policy of the Ministry of Defence and its associated public bodies, including the British Armed Forces. The Committee's remit does not generally include Defence Intelligence which instead falls under the Intelligence and Security Committee of Parliament.

Membership
As of October 2022, the members of the committee are as follows:

Changes since 2019

2017–2019 Parliament
The chair was elected on 12 July 2017, with the members of the committee being announced on 11 September 2017.

2015–2017 Parliament
The chair was elected on 18 June 2015, with members being announced on 6 July 2015.

Changes 2015–2017

2010–2015 Parliament
The chair was elected on 10 June 2010, with members being announced on 12 July 2010.

Changes 2010–2015

Chair of the Defence Select Committee

Election results
From June 2010 chairs of select committees have been directly elected by a secret ballot of the whole House of Commons using the alternative vote system. Candidates with the fewest votes are eliminated and their votes redistributed until one remaining candidate has more than half of valid votes. Elections are held at the beginning of a parliament or in the event of a vacancy.

See also
Parliamentary Committees of the United Kingdom

References

External links
Official website

Select Committees of the British House of Commons
1979 establishments in the United Kingdom
Parliamentary committees on Defence